I Want to Be a Vet may refer to:

"I Want to Be a Vet", an episode of the television series Little Princess
"I Want to Be a Vet", an episode of the television series Teletubbies

See also 
Vet (disambiguation)